Makarovskaya is a rural locality (a village) in Shelotskoye Rural Settlement, Verkhovazhsky District, Vologda Oblast, Russia. The population was 22 as of 2002.

Geography 
Makarovskaya is located 58 km southwest of Verkhovazhye (the district's administrative centre) by road. Afoninskaya is the nearest rural locality.

References 

Rural localities in Verkhovazhsky District